The 1981 Troy State Trojans football team represented Troy State University (now known as Troy University) as a member of the Gulf South Conference (GSC) during the 1981 NCAA Division II football season. Led by sixth-year head coach Charlie Bradshaw, the Trojans compiled an overall record of 3–7, with a mark of 1–5 in conference play, and finished sixth in the GSC.

Schedule

References

Troy State
Troy Trojans football seasons
Troy State Trojans football